Dianthus freynii, or Freyn's carnation, in Bosnian Freynov karanfil or Freynov klinčić, is native endemic of Herzegovina karst, Bosnia and Herzegovina. It belongs to the family Caryophyllaceae (carnations).

Description
This karst carnation is a dwarf, bruise-greenish, perennial, with a height of about 1–7 cm. Stems are regularly onoflowering, usually with two pairs of leaves, which are pins bruise with her stem. The leaves are in turfs, 1–2 cm long and broad barely 1 mm. They are fuzzy, rough, at the edges cartilagous, at the top almost dull.

It blooms in July and August. Flowers browny-redish, calyx leaves triangular lancetal. Petals are purpurish and relatively large, long up to about 14 mm; width is about 6 mm.

Ecology and distribution
Freyn's carnation is growing in the alpine zone of the highest Hercegovinian mountains, at elevations of about 1900–2230 m.

Dianthus freynii prefers the shallow limestone soils, at organogenic and organomineral moldy soils and dolomite sirozes.

This carnation is endemic to the Dinaric mountains, with the center of area on high Herzegovinian mountains Prenj and Čvrsnica and its northeastern plateau Plasa (locus classicus), between the Doljanka river, Neretva, and Grabovica river. It belongs, therefore, to the Herzegovinian endemic center.

References

External links
The Plant List: Dianthus freynii Vandas

Flora of Bosnia and Herzegovina
Flora of Europe
freynii